Peteliacma is a genus of moths belonging to the subfamily Tortricinae of the family Tortricidae. It contains only one species, Peteliacma torrescens, which is found in Madagascar.

See also
List of Tortricidae genera

References

 , 1912, Exotic Microlepid. 1: 12.
 , 2005, World Catalogue of Insects 5.

External links
tortricidae.com

Archipini
Taxa named by Edward Meyrick
Monotypic moth genera
Moths of Africa
Tortricidae genera